The 2012 Capital City 400 presented by Virginia Is For Lovers was a NASCAR Sprint Cup Series stock car race held on April 28, 2012 at Richmond International Raceway in Richmond, Virginia. Contested over 400 laps, it was the ninth race of the 2012 season. Kyle Busch of Joe Gibbs Racing took his first win of the season, while Dale Earnhardt Jr. finished second and Tony Stewart finished third.

Race report

Background

Richmond International Raceway is one of five short tracks to hold NASCAR races; the others are Bristol Motor Speedway, Dover International Speedway, Martinsville Speedway, and Phoenix International Raceway. The track's turns are banked at fourteen degrees. The front stretch, the location of the finish line, is banked at eight degrees while the back stretch has two degrees of banking. The racetrack has seats for 97,912 spectators.

Before the race, Greg Biffle led the Drivers' Championship with 312 points, and Martin Truex Jr. stood in second with 297. Matt Kenseth was third in the Drivers' Championship with 295 points, four ahead of Dale Earnhardt Jr. and six ahead of Denny Hamlin in fourth and fifth. Kevin Harvick with 287 was twelve ahead of Jimmie Johnson, as Tony Stewart with 265 points, was fourteen ahead of Carl Edwards, and sixteen in front of Ryan Newman. In the Manufacturers' Championship, Chevrolet was leading with 54 points, eight ahead of Ford. Toyota, with 43 points, was ten points ahead of Dodge in the battle for third. Kyle Busch was the race's defending race winner after winning it in 2011.

Practice and qualifying

Two practice sessions were held before the race on Friday. The first session lasted 120 minutes long, while the second was 45 minutes long. Mark Martin was quickest with a time of 21.309 seconds in the first session, under nine-hundredths of a second faster than Biffle. Paul Menard was third, followed by Clint Bowyer, Joey Logano, and Johnson. A. J. Allmendinger was seventh, still within two-tenths of a second of Martin's time. Also in the first session, Menard collided into the wall after his throttle stuck, causing a red-flag to clean the track. In the second practice session, Earnhardt Jr. was fastest with a time of 21.800 seconds, only 0.026 seconds quicker than second-placed Edwards. Landon Cassill took third place, ahead of Jeff Gordon, Kyle Busch and Bowyer. Michael McDowell managed to be seventh quickest.

Forty-five cars were entered for qualifying, but only forty-three would race because of NASCAR's qualifying procedure. Martin clinched his 53rd pole position during his career, with a time of 21.040 seconds. He was joined on the front row of the grid by Edwards. Harvick qualified third, Allmendinger took fourth, and Kyle Busch started fifth. Gordon, Hamlin, Truex Jr., Kasey Kahne, and Earnhardt Jr. rounded out the first ten positions. The two drivers who failed to qualify for the race were Scott Riggs and J. J. Yeley, who had times of 21.807 and 22.030 seconds.

Results

Qualifying

References

NASCAR races at Richmond Raceway
Capital City 400
Capital City 400
Capital City 400